Marumba spectabilis, the rosey swirled hawkmoth, is a moth of the family Sphingidae. The species was first described by Arthur Gardiner Butler in 1875.

Distribution 
It is known from Nepal, north-eastern India, southern China, Thailand, Laos, Vietnam, Malaysia (Peninsular, Sarawak) and Indonesia (Sumatra, Java, Kalimantan, Sulawesi).

Description 
The wingspan is 94–118 mm. It is more rufous brown than other Marumba species. There is a strong tornal loop on the forewing upperside, as well as weak and irregular bands. There is a large orange-tawny area on the posterior part of the forewing underside. A similar orange-tawny patch is found on the termen close to tornus on the hindwing underside.

Biology 
There are three generations per year in northern Guangdong.

The larvae have been recorded feeding on Meliosma rigida. They are bright yellowish green above the spiracles, with yellow tubercles. Below the spiracles, the body is watery green with white tubercles, separated from the dorsal part by a bright yellow subspiracular stripe that is edged ventrally by brown, most intense on the thorax, weak or absent over the abdominal segments. The oblique bands are formed by yellow or red tubercles. The horn is bright green.

Subspecies
Marumba spectabilis spectabilis
Marumba spectabilis malayana Rothschild & Jordan, 1903 (Sundaland)

References

Marumba
Moths described in 1875